Castus is a Latin word meaning clean and pure.

Lucius Artorius Castus, Roman general
Castus and Emilius, Roman martyrs and saints
Castus (rebel), Roman rebel gladiator in the Third Servile War

See also
Vitex agnus-castus, a Mediterranean plant, also called Chaste Tree, Chasteberry, or Monk's Pepper